Matthew Foster (born 15 January 2000) is an Irish cricketer.

Career 
He made his first-class debut on 31 March 2019, for Cardiff MCCU against Sussex, as part of the Marylebone Cricket Club University fixtures. 

He made his List A debut for Northern Knights in the 2019 Inter-Provincial Cup in Ireland on 20 August 2019. 

He made his Twenty20 debut for Munster Reds in the 2020 Inter-Provincial Trophy on 20 August 2020.

He was named in the Northern Knights side for the 2023 domestic season.

In February 2023 he was received his first international call-up, included in the Test and ODI squad for the tour of Sri Lanka.

In March 2023 he was awarded a casual contract by Cricket Ireland.

References

External links
 

2000 births
Living people
Irish cricketers
Cardiff MCCU cricketers
Munster Reds cricketers
Northern Knights cricketers
Place of birth missing (living people)
Cricketers from Belfast